Saint John the Baptist as a Boy is a painting by the Flemish artist Michaelina Wautier. It depicts Saint John the Baptist as a young shepherd, wearing a sheepskin cover over his right shoulder and with the traditional attributes of a lamp and a simple wooden staff in the shape of a cross. It was painted in the 1650s and is now in the collection of the Museo Lazaro Galdiano in Madrid. The work was previously attributed to the Spanish painter Juan Martín Cabezalero.

References 

Paintings by Michaelina Wautier
1650s paintings
Paintings depicting John the Baptist
Sheep in art